Tomasz Piotr Poręba (born 1973 in Grybów, Poland) is a Polish politician, civil servant and journalist, Member of the European Parliament in VII, VIII, IX term from Poland, historian and political scientist.

Son of Maria and Antoni, a railway worker. He majored in history and political science from the Pedagogical University of Cracow, Poland. He later continued his studies in journalism. He then graduated with a postgraduate degree in European studies from the University of Warsaw and Maastricht University. During his studies in Poland, he professionally played football as striker in III league Cracow’s clubs - Kabel Kraków, Karpaty Siepraw, Górnik Wieliczka. His sports career was ended following an injury. He also worked as sport journalist in Gazeta Krakowska.

In the late 1990s he worked in the Chancellery of the Prime Minister, then in the Institute of National Remembrance (IPN) in Warsaw. In 2003 he joined the Law and Justice Party, where he worked as the Head of Information and Public Relations Department. As of 2004 he worked in the European Parliament in Brussels as Senior Advisor of the political group Union for Europe of the Nations in the Committee on Regional Development and then in the Committee on Foreign Affairs. He was the spokesperson for Law and Justice Members in the European Parliament.

In 2009 he was elected as  a Member of the European Parliament from Podkarpackie Voivodeship. He was the vice-chair of the Delegation of Law and Justice (PiS) in the European Parliament and a member of the Presidium of the European Conservatives and Reformists. In 2011 he became a leader of Law and Justice Election Committee for the national parliament. In November 2011 he was elected by the Law and Justice Political Council to become member of the Political Committee, the decision making body of the party.

In 2014 he was re-elected with 113 704 votes as a Member of the European Parliament for the Law and Justice Party for Podkarpackie Voivodeship, he gained one of the best election results in Poland. He was a vice-chair of the Committee of Transport and Tourism in the European Parliament and vice-chair of Law and Justice Delegation in the EP.

In 2014 Tomasz Poręba became the president of a conservative European think tank  "New Direction".

In 2018 he again became a leader of the Election Committee of Law and Justice for the successful local government elections and also led the Law and Justice campaign for elections to the European Parliament in 2019, in which he was re-elected as Member of the European Parliament from the list of Law and Justice from Podkarpackie Voivodeship for his third term. He received 276 014 votes and it was best individual result in these elections in Poland (37% of votes cast in the constituency).

In December 2018 Tomasz Poręba became a Vice-President of the Polish Olympic Committee.

Private life:

He is married and has two daughters.

References

External links
 European Parliament official biography

Law and Justice MEPs
1973 births
Living people
People from Nowy Sącz County
MEPs for Poland 2014–2019
MEPs for Poland 2019–2024